Agoglia is a surname. Notable people with the surname include:

Esmeralda Agoglia (1923–2014), Argentine ballet dancer and choreographer
John Agoglia (1937–2014), American television executive
Tad Skylar Agoglia (born 1976), American activist